The 2022 Northwestern State Demons football team represented Northwestern State University as a member of the Southland Conference during the 2022 NCAA Division I FCS football season. Led by fifth-year head coach Brad Laird, the Demons played their home games at Harry Turpin Stadium in Natchitoches, Louisiana.

Preseason

Preseason poll
The Southland Conference released their preseason poll on July 20, 2022. The Demons were picked to finish fifth in the conference.

Preseason All–Southland Teams
The Southland Conference announced the 2022 preseason all-conference football team selections on July 13, 2022. Northwestern State had a total of 5 players selected. 

Offense

2nd Team
Scooter Adams – Running Back, RS-JR

Defense

1st Team
Shemar Bartholomew – Defensive Back, SR
PJ Herrington – Defensive Back, SR

2nd Team
Isaiah Longino – Defensive Lineman, SR
Jomard Valsin – Defensive Lineman, SR

Schedule
Northwestern State finalized their 2022 schedule on January 17, 2022.

Game summaries

at No. 3 Montana

vs. Grambling State

at Southern Miss

Lamar

Statistics

Nicholls

at Eastern Illinois

at Houston Christian

No. 16 Southeast Missouri State

at Texas A&M-Commerce

at No. 25 Southeastern Louisiana

No. 5 Incarnate Word

Personnel

References

Northwestern State Demons
Northwestern State Demons football seasons
Northwestern State Demons